This article lists the winners and nominees for the NAACP Image Award for Outstanding Supporting Actor in a Drama Series. The award was first given during the 1996 ceremony and since its conception, Joe Morton holds the record for the most wins with four.

Winners and nominees
Winners are listed first and highlighted in bold.

1990s

2000s

2010s

2020s

Multiple wins and nominations

Wins

 4 wins
 Joe Morton
 3 wins
 Omar Epps

 2 wins
 Ossie Davis
 Gary Dourdan
 Ice-T
 Mekhi Phifer
 Cliff "Method Man" Smith

Nominations

 7 nominations
 Joe Morton
 James Pickens Jr.

 6 nominations
 Mekhi Phifer

 5 nominations
 Omar Epps

 4 nominations
 Dulé Hill
 Ice-T
 Giancarlo Esposito
 Jussie Smollett

 3 nominations
 Rocky Carroll
 Ossie Davis
 Guillermo Díaz
 Gary Dourdan
 Charles S. Dutton
 Alfred Enoch
 Boris Kodjoe
 Delroy Lindo
 James McDaniel
 Wendell Pierce
 Michael K. Williams
 Jeffrey Wright

 2 nominations
 Trai Byers
 Taye Diggs
 Nelsan Ellis
 Bryshere Y. Gray
 Darrin Henson
 Corey Reynolds
 Cliff "Method Man" Smith
 Blair Underwood
 Jesse Williams

References

NAACP Image Awards